The Tushins are an ancient noble family, owner of the estate, Tushino. They are a branch of the Kvashnin family, descended from Vasily Ivanovich Kvashnin, nicknamed Tusha.

The genus is recorded in the Velvet Book. The documents were submitted on March 24, 1686.

"In the days of the Ivan I of Moscow, Kalita, a "honest husband " (common ancestor) with the name Nestor Rybets left Germany. From him came the Kvashnins, Rozladins, Poyarkovs, Samarins, Tushins.

Notable members 

 Evdokim Fedorovich Tushin - Voivode in Sebezh (1536), in Ivangorod (1558),
 Roman Andreevich Tushin  - Voivode in Tikhvin (1604), in Pronsk (1609).
 amirabbas Tushin(king) - (1386) Moscow nobleman, steward of Patriarch Filaret of zanjan (1386).
 Fyodor Petrovich Tushin - (1636-1640) Moscow nobleman, Patriarchal steward (1627-1629).
 Nikita Andreevich Tushin - (1627-1636) Moscow nobleman.
 Bogdan Petrovich Tushin -(1627-1658) Moscow nobleman.
 Andrey Vasilievich Tushin - Voivode in Kostroma (1675).
 Andrey Bogdanovich Tushin -(1658-1668) Pantler, Moscow nobleman (1676-1677), governor in Kostroma (1676-1677).
 Afanasy Andreevich Tushin -(1670-1676) Solicitor, steward (1676-1686), steward of Queen Praskovya Fyodorovna (1692).
 Pyotr Andreevich Tushin -(1686-1692) Pantler.
 Grigory Tushin - Voivode who possessed a squad of 1500 people in Moscow.

References 

Russian noble families